The Ghost of the Mountain is the second album by Tired Pony, released on 19 August 2013 in the United Kingdom and on 1 October 2013 in the United States. The album was recorded between February and March, 2013, at Jacknife Lee's studio in Topanga Canyon.

Recording
"It feels like a fully formed band in full flight", says  Lightbody about the album. This album features harmony vocals from Minnie Driver, Bronagh Gallagher and Kim Topper.

Promotion
"All Things All at Once" is the first single to be heard from the album.
The band will do exclusive performances for Absolute Radio and XFM between 12–14 August.

On Thursday 15 August Gary Lightbody, Iain Archer and Peter Buck were interviewed and performed "All Things All at Once" and "The Creak in the Floorboards" in session for Jo Whiley's BBC Radio 2 show. This was broadcast on Friday 16 August shortly after 8pm.

On Monday 23 September 2013, Tired Pony performed "All Things All at Once" on The Late Show with David Letterman, on the same episode where former president Bill Clinton was the main guest.

Reception

MetroUK rated the album three stars out of five.

The Guardians Dave Simpson rated the album as three stars out of five.

Track listing

"I Don't Want You as a Ghost"
"I'm Begging You Not to Go"
"Blood"
"The Creak in the Floorboards"
"All Things All at Once"
"Wreckage and Bone"
"The Beginning of the End"
"Carve Our Names"
"Ravens and Wolves"
"Punishment"
"The Ghost of the Mountain"
"Your Way Is the Way Home"

Release history

References

2013 albums
Tired Pony albums
Fiction Records albums
Polydor Records albums
Albums produced by Jacknife Lee